Agrotis kingi is a moth of the family Noctuidae. It is found in Saskatchewan.

Agrotis
Moths of North America
Moths described in 1932